Talib El-Shibib (22 March 1934 – 12 October 1997) was an Iraqi politician. Born in Babylon Province, he studied engineering at Imperial College in London.

El-Shibib was elected to the leadership of Arab Socialist Ba'ath Party, and was one of a triumvirate who planned the later coup against President Abdul Karim Qassim. He became foreign minister under the new regime in 1963.

Internal disagreements led him to go in exile. After the second coup in 1968, El-Shibib was given several ambassadorial posts. In 1976 he resigned from the post as Iraqi ambassador to Germany and went into exile again when disagreements arose between him and Saddam Hussein’s policies. He devoted the remainder of his life in exile while campaigning against Saddam and for a democratic Iraq.

1934 births
1997 deaths
Ambassadors of Iraq to Germany
Members of the Regional Command of the Arab Socialist Ba'ath Party – Iraq Region
Government ministers of Iraq
Iraqi democracy activists
Iraqi Shia Muslims
Members of the National Command of the Ba'ath Party
People from Hillah
Permanent Representatives of Iraq to the United Nations